Nelson Marshall Cooke (born 4 March 1938) is an Australian retired politician. Born in Brisbane, he was educated at the University of Queensland before becoming a barrister. In 1972, he was elected to the Australian House of Representatives as the Liberal member for Petrie. He was not re-endorsed by the party for the 1974 election, being overlooked in favour of Redcliffe Deputy Mayor John Hodges. Cooke retired from politics, returning to law.

References

Liberal Party of Australia members of the Parliament of Australia
Members of the Australian House of Representatives for Petrie
Members of the Australian House of Representatives
1938 births
Living people
20th-century Australian politicians
Australian barristers